In demonology, Orobas is a powerful Great Prince of Hell, having twenty legions of demons under his control.

He supposedly gives true answers of things past, present, divinity, and the creation of the world; he also confers dignities and prelacies, and the favour of friends and foes. Orobas is faithful to the conjurer, does not permit that any spirit tempts him, does not focus on directly deceiving, but instead, encourages people to become spiritually slothful. This delays, discourages, and eventually prevents individuals and societies from ever establishing a harmonious relationship with God.

He is depicted as a horse that changes into a man under the conjurer's request.

The name could come from the Latin 'orobias', a type of incense.

See also

References

Goetia - S. L. MacGregor Mathers (1904)
Pseudomonarchia daemonum - Johann Wier (1583)
Dictionnaire Infernal - Collin de Plancy (1863)

Sources
Joseph H. Peterson, editor, Lemegeton Clavicula Salomonis: The Lesser Key of Solomon Weiserbooks, 2001, .
S. L. MacGregor Mathers, A. Crowley, The Goetia: The Lesser Key of Solomon the King (1904). 1995 reprint: .

Goetic demons